Tom Rogers (born 1885) was an English footballer who played as a defender for Liverpool in The Football League. Rogers started his career at Rossendale United where his performances led to a transfer to Liverpool. He made his debut for the club on the last day of the 1907–08 season. The next season, he was a regular in the starting lineup he made 12 appearances for the team before he suffered a serious injury in a match against Nottingham Forest which meant he did not play for 13 months. Following his return he was unable to reclaim his place in the side and only played sporadically.

References

1885 births
Year of death missing
English footballers
Liverpool F.C. players
English Football League players
Association football defenders